The Story Museum is a museum in Oxford, England. It aims to encourage education and support community engagement by exploring all forms of stories. It is a registered charity under English law. As of 7 July 2018 the exhibitions of the museum were closed for renovation, although the cafe remained open. The museum was slated to reopen to the public on Saturday 4 April 2020, but the opening was delayed due to the COVID-19 pandemic.  It partially reopened on 6 August, with visitors able to visit the cafe, shop and two of the new galleries. The full reopening happened on the 24 October 2020.

History
The museum was founded in 2003 and initially operated as a virtual museum with no premises of its own. It coordinated several projects and exhibitions, and worked and associated with authors and illustrators including  Michael Morpurgo, Terry Pratchett, Philip Pullman, Jacqueline Wilson and Quentin Blake.

In November 2009, it was announced that the museum would move to premises at Rochester House in Pembroke Street, following a gift of £2.5m from a private donor. The Museum is continuing to fundraise for its ongoing development to complete the refurbishment of its site. The Story Museum coordinates Oxford's Alice's Day, which is held on the first Saturday in July to celebrate the first telling of Alice's Adventures in Wonderland. The museum also hosts author events, children's activities and drop-in activities, as well as running outreach projects in schools in Oxfordshire and beyond.

Exhibitions
In 2012 The Museum worked with then-artist-in-residence Ted Dewan to build a "Storyloom", a large scale piece of kinetic art with an in-depth fictional history. The Storyloom went on to be featured in the 2012 Cultural Olympiad.

From 2016 until 2017, the Story Museum ran the exhibition 26 Characters featuring photography by Cambridge Jones, which was developed with the involvement of children's authors and illustrators, all of whom were asked to choose and then dress as their favourite childhood characters. 
The participants included:
 Terry Jones as Rupert the Bear
 Michael Morpurgo as Abel Magwitch
 Philip Pullman as Long John Silver
 Ted and Pandora Dewan as Pod and Arriety
 Benjamin Zephaniah as Anansi
 Katherine Rundell as A Wild Thing
 Charlie Higson as Boromir
 Terry Pratchett as William Brown
 Malorie Blackman as the Wicked Witch of the West
 Steven Butler and Francesca Simon as The Mad Hatter and The Queen of Hearts
 Shirley Hughes and Clare Vulliamy as Miss Prism and Lady Bracknell
 Geraldine McCaughrean as Bellerophon
 Holly Smale as the White Witch
 Michael Rosen as Till Eulenspiegel
 Neil Gaiman as Badger
 Julia and Malcolm Donaldson as The Owl and the Pussycat
 Katrice Horsley as Mary Poppins
 Anthony Horowitz as Dr Jekyll and Mr Hyde
 Frances Hardinge as The Scarlet Pimpernel
 Jamila Gavin as Hanuman
 Kevin Crossley-Holland as Merlin
 Cressida Cowell as Peter Pan

From 2016 The Story Museum ran an exhibition called Animal, focusing on the role of animals as characters in texts including Watership Down, Fantastic Mr Fox, Wallace and Gromit, Maus and the works of Aesop.

In 2017 The Story Museum ran an exhibition called Wild About Colour featuring a number of pieces by Brian Wildsmith alongside works by contemporary illustrators who had been influenced by his use of colour. The exhibition was curated by Helen Cooper and displayed the work of Shaun Tan and Korky Paul amongst others.

Renovation 
The museum closed for renovation on 7 July 2018. The renovation is anticipated to cost £6 million. They received a £1 million grant from the Heritage Lottery Fund in 2015, and a £2 million grant from Arts Council England. The renovation was completed in 2020.

See also
 Roald Dahl Museum and Story Centre
 Museum of Oxford
 Seven Stories
 List of books about Oxford
 Society for Storytelling
 Ministry of Stories
 826 Valencia

References

External links

 The Story Museum website

Museums established in 2003
Museums in Oxford
British children's literature
Education in Oxford
Educational charities based in the United Kingdom
Charities based in Oxfordshire
Literary museums in England
2003 establishments in England